Burnie is the mascot of the Miami Heat, the NBA basketball team. Burnie is a rough, anthropomorphic depiction of the fireball featured on the team's logo.

Appearance
The Burnie costume is a full-body suit. The body is orange fur, with orange feathers for hair. The "nose" is a green basketball. Burnie wears number 0 (or 00) for the Heat, typically in a black uniform, although he has also worn the Heat's red and white jerseys during playoff promotions. He also sometimes wears a white team T-shirt.

During the 2012 NBA Playoffs, in accord with the team's "White Hot Playoffs" theme, Burnie's costume temporarily changed to an all-white version of the same suit, with black trim around the jersey's text.

Legal problems
Burnie was sued in 1994 during an exhibition game in Puerto Rico. Burnie selected a woman from the audience, dragged her by the feet, and danced on the court with her during a time-out. The woman turned out to be the wife of a federal judge. The woman pulled away from Burnie and fell. Burnie faced 20 years in jail after being charged with aggravated assault and battery. Burnie was also sued prior for US$1 million due to the emotional distress the woman went through. The media ridiculed the case, and she appeared several times on late-night television. The case was settled for $50,000.

Burnie's hijinks also led to another lawsuit in March 2015 and March 2017. On both occasions, people were injured by Burnie while he was performing. The same lawyer represented the two clients on the two occasions and both cases were settled. Both agreements remain confidential.

References

External links 
Burnie Report
Burnie Vision

Miami Heat
National Basketball Association mascots